Dan Ceman (born July 25, 1973) is a Canadian professional ice hockey coach and a former ice hockey player. He is currently the head coach of Slovak HC Košice.

Playing career 
Born in Windsor, Ontario, Ceman attended the University of Windsor before turning pro in 1997. He first played for AHL’s Kentucky Thoroughblades. In the 1997-98 season he was instrumental in the Hampton Roads Admirals’ run to the ECHL championship title, the following season, he won the Calder Cup with the Providence Bruins.

Ceman then took his game overseas, joining the Sheffield Steelers of the British Ice Hockey Superleague for the 1999-00 campaign. He remained in England until 2003, spending the next three years with the Bracknell Bees.

He then spent time playing in Denmark and France, before returning to England for the 2005-06 season, which he split between EIHL sides Sheffield Steelers and Nottingham Panthers. In 2006, Ceman embarked on a four-year stint with Danish first-division side SønderjyskE Ishockey. As a team captain, Ceman led SønderjyskE to back-to-back Danish championships in 2009 and 2010.

Ceman spent the last two years of his playing career in the Elite Ice Hockey League, turning out for the Dundee Stars (acting as player-coach) and the Fife Flyers: On December 7, 2011, with the team standing at second-last in the league, the Dundee Stars announced that Ceman had been released for performance. On 13 December 2011 it was announced that Ceman had signed with the Fife Flyers for the remainder of the 2011-12 season. Ceman announced on May 30, 2012 that he had signed to become an assistant coach in Denmark and would retire as a player.

Coaching career 
After serving as player-coach of the Dundee Stars from 2010 to 2012, Ceman was named head coach of Danish second division side Vojens IK in 2012. In April 2013, he joined the coaching staff of SønderjyskE Ishockey of the Danish top-flight as an assistant, helping the team win the 2013 Danish championship. In May 2013, he was promoted to SønderjyskE Ishockey head coach and guided the club to championship titles in 2014 and 2015. In February 2015, he signed a new two-year deal with the club. In 2017 he signed deal with HC '05 Banská Bystrica. 
 In 2021 he became the head coach of HC Košice.

References

External links

1973 births
Living people
Bracknell Bees players
Canadian ice hockey centres
Dundee Stars players
Fife Flyers players
Frederikshavn White Hawks players
Hampton Roads Admirals players
Ice hockey people from Ontario
Kentucky Thoroughblades players
Nottingham Panthers players
Portland Pirates players
Providence Bruins players
Sheffield Steelers players
SønderjyskE Ishockey players
Sportspeople from Windsor, Ontario
Canadian ice hockey coaches
Canadian expatriate ice hockey players in England
Canadian expatriate ice hockey players in Scotland
Canadian expatriate ice hockey players in Denmark
Canadian expatriate ice hockey players in the United States
Canadian expatriate sportspeople in Slovakia
Canadian expatriate sportspeople in Austria
Canadian expatriate sportspeople in Denmark